Hilbig is a variant of Helbig (German: from the medieval personal name Heilwig or Helwig) and a German surname. Notable people with the surname include:
 Ronja Hilbig (born 1990), German singer
 Wolfgang Hilbig (1941–2007), German writer and poet
Surnames of Austrian origin

German-language surnames
Surnames of German origin